Zacharia (Zekaarya) Ofri (זכריה עופרי)    A(7 August 1932 – 9 March 2018) was an Israeli basketball player. He was captain of the Israeli National team that competed in the men's tournament at the 1952 Summer Olympics as well as in the 1953 European Cup in Moscow (name transliterated as Afari)  and the 1954 World Cup in Rio de Janeiro (name transliterated as Afri) 

Ofri was also captain of the Maccabi Tel Aviv basketball team in Israel.

The Israeli national team was unable to play in the 1956 Olympics because of the Sinai War  (Ofri served in the Tank Corps). In 1957, as a compensation for missing the Olympic games, the team went on an exhibition tour in the United States.  Ofri was offered a scholarship to play on the NYU basketball (and soccer) teams, and completed his degree in education at NYU.

Ofri taught mathematics at Lincoln High School in Yonkers, New York, until 1983 when he moved back to Israel. In 2013 he was inducted into the Israeli Basketball Hall of Fame.

His daughter is the physician and writer Danielle Ofri.

References

External links
 

1932 births
2018 deaths
Israeli men's basketball players
Olympic basketball players of Israel
Basketball players at the 1952 Summer Olympics
Place of birth missing
1954 FIBA World Championship players